Coral nudibranch may refer to:

 Phyllodesmium horridum
 Phyllodesmium serratum

Animal common name disambiguation pages